Mr Zippy formed in the coastal town of Clevedon, North Somerset, England in 1993. The band play skate punk.

History 
Formed in the coastal town of Clevedon, North Somerset in 1993. Mr Zippy formed while they were still at school in the early 90s. Many members came and went as the band found their footing in the growing punk rock scene in the UK.

The first solid formation of the band came together in 1995 when the two founder members (guitarist Jon Burlinson and vocalist Mads) recruited 15-year-old drummer Pete Jennings to replace James Hester (now drumming in UK band Malaki). After the departure of bassist Mike Britton (of P4FT) the band hired a young Bassist from Portishead, Daryl Barrett-Cross. The band spent almost a year away from the public before debuting the new line-up, new songs and style at The Full Moon pub in Bristol.

In 1997, after gaining a strong following in Bristol and the surrounding area, the band recorded two demo cassettes at the Blue Room Studio in Bristol, "Two Way Family Favourites" and "Cheggers Plays Punk". The band got the attention of 21-year-old Greg Pearson (Greg Elk), who was starting his own label "Pigman Records", who agreed to put out an EP for the band.

1998–1999 
In 1998, with the breakup of his own band Yellowskin the band asked Greg to join Mr.Zippy as a 2nd guitarist. He did and with more money to put into Mr.Zippy the band once again entered the Blue Room Studio in Bristol to record their debut album "What You Are Like Says A Lot About The Kind Of Person You Are" which was released in 1999.

The band started to set sight their sights out of the local area and played around the UK gaining a large following in the UK punk underground and playing with such bands as Mustard Plug, No comply, Spiderplug (Later Adequate 7), Lightyear (band), Five Knuckle, Big D & The Kids Table, King Prawn, Capdown and formed a growing friendship with the band 4ft Fingers.

The band also scored some stranger support slots playing with such bands as Somerset legends The Wurzels, Alex Kane's AntiProduct and Skiffle band Dynamo Rhythm Aces.

2000–2001 
In 2000, the band booked their first UK tour with Japanese thrash band Displaced Person, gaining a growing UK following. The band also started to appear on compilation albums worldwide.

In 2001, they entered the Whitehouse Studios in Weston-Super-Mare to record the "Another Weekend" 7" which was limited to only 100 copies and hand-numbered. It was around this time that they earned the attention of Golf Records who offered to distribute the band's EP and album via Plastic Head Distribution. As luck had it Golf thought more of the band over time and when the band's debut album sold out, Golf signed the band up for a three-album deal, offering to re-release the debut album first.

In the summer of 2001, the band underwent a self-organised tour of Japan. Although the tour was a great success it did bring to the band's attention their growing displeasure with bassist Daryl Barrett-Cross who was fired from the band on their return to the UK. Daryl went on to form the gore-metal band Amputated.

2002–2003 
The band continued to gig, headling many shows or playing with such bands as Snuff, Consumed, King Prawn, MU330.

They had the help of temporary bassists Stef Snowdon and Hambis DeLaney before enlisting Mark "Frank" Francis into the band, previously of the band The Merics who were a favourite of BBC Radio One DJ, John Peel.

Frank was to play two small shows with the band before they embarked on a tour of Norway with Norwegian bands Late98 and Shitzoo.

The album What You Are Like Says A Lot About The Kind Of Person You Are came out on Golf Records while the band were away. Released with a new cover and including the three tracks from the "Another Weekend" 7" and one previously unreleased track entitled "Here We Go Again".

More touring followed and the band hooked up with Manager John Sheller, whose previous skills had seen him managing the UK rock band FM (British band) on a tour with Bon Jovi. The relationship, however, was short-lived.

BBC Radio One show The Lock Up played the band a lot, which was great support. The TV channels P-Rock and Scuzz TV were playing a lot of the band's friends at the time (notably friends Whitmore and 4ft Fingers) yet Mr.Zippy chose to abstain from making a video to appear on the channels.

The band entered Mighty Atom studios (Mighty Atom Records) in 2002 to record their second album Ambition Is Critical. During the recording, they were visited by a young Funeral For A Friend who were just recording their first demo.

At the start of 2003, the band joined forces with Crucial Talent Booking and underwent a three-month tour of the UK with friends 4ft Fingers. Ambition Is Critical came out once again while the band was away on tour.

On returning the band was flooded with offers of future tours. With friend's Gash, label mates Tuuli and even a planned tour with (the then unknown in the UK but friends with the band) Bumblefoot.

Sadly, singer Mads broke his ankle in a BMX accident and was unable to undergo any of the planned tours.

The band took a hiatus until September 2003 when they hit the road again with friends Caffeine, for the last tour the band has undergone to date.

Guitarist Greg Pearson left the band after this tour to move to Sweden and pursue new projects. He was replaced with Guitarist Andy Baker in November 2003, and the band started to write new material with a slightly new direction, putting together an album and ep's worth of new songs.

2004–present 
Although no longer with the support of Golf Records, the band continued to gig as before, gaining high-profile support slots such as playing with Citizen Fish, Satanic Surfers, and Ten Foot Pole.

2010 saw the release of the book Second Place Heroes which is a history of the band from 1997 through to 2003 via the eyes of ex-guitarist Greg Pearson.

2010 also saw the departure of Guitarist Andy Baker, to spend more time working with his main project New Riot (Ex-Fandangle). Mr Zippy continue as a four-piece band, playing gigs and writing new material.

In 2016, former guitarist Greg C Pearson died in Poole, Dorset, aged 41.

Style
Drawing on their influences ranging from Satanic Surfers, Face to Face, Bad Religion, Ramones, SNFU, Faith No More, Iron Maiden and Samiam. The music is melodic, up beat and positive and at the same time can be hard hitting. Goodmusicrocks.com described their album Ambition Is Critical as "Bouncy, but its still has that element of hardcore that makes you wanna run around screaming at the top of your lungs...".

Discography

Demos/EPs/albums/compilations

References

External links 
 http://www.mrzippy.co.uk Official Website

English punk rock groups